Strange Symmetry is the debut EP by Past Lives, released in 2008 by Suicide Squeeze Records.

Reception
The EP received positive reviews from critics. Jim Allen of Allmusic states that the EP ranges between "raw, garagey punk explosions" and "quirky, angular, post-punk-influenced creep-rock nuggets" with "a dark, edgy feel". Chris Middleman of Spectrum Culture describes the EP as "more interesting musically" than Jaguar Love, maintaining its post-punk feel. Sputnik Music describes the EP as an "outstanding debut" with "just enough of a taste to leave listeners dying for what a full length album will sound like". Scott Gray of Exclaim! states that the EP sounds "like a natural enough progression from Young Machetes" with "enough fresh perspective on instrumentation and melodic impetus" to establish the band as a distinct entity. Clash states that the songs of the EP "pack a much rawer punch, having more in common with Fugazi and Hüsker Dü" compared to "Jaguar Love's many-layered arrangements". Jonah Flicker of Blurt states that the EP proves that Past Lives sounds more interesting and arguably closer to the style of Blood Brothers.

Track listing
"Beyond Gone" - 2:54
"Strange Symmetry" - 3:07
"Skull Lender" - 2:40
"Reverse The Curse" - 2:38
"Chrome Life" - 3:55

Personnel
Past Lives
Jordan Blilie - Vocals
Mark Gajadhar - Drums
Morgan Henderson - Baritone Guitar, Keyboards
Devin Welch - Guitar

Other personnel
Dann Gallucci - engineering and mixing

References

External links
SuicideSqueeze.net

Suicide Squeeze Records albums
2008 EPs
Past Lives (band) albums